Luoping County is located in Qujing City, in eastern Yunnan province, China, bordering Guizhou province to the east and the Guangxi Zhuang Autonomous Region to the southeast.

The county of Luoping in eastern Yunnan is noted for its springtime scenery, when its fields of canola (also known as rapeseed) plants are in full bloom,  surrounding the area's mountains with a blanket of golden flowers.

Located near where Yunnan meets Guizhou and Guangxi, Luoping is about 240 kilometers east of Kunming. Not unlike the terraced fields of Yuanyang in southern Yunnan, Luoping's canola fields attract many photographers.

The canola flowering lasts until late June. During this high travel season for the county regular buses leave from Kunming's bus stations on an almost hourly basis.

Administrative divisions
Luoping County has 3 subdistricts, 4 towns, 3 townships and 3 ethnic townships. 
3 subdistricts
 Luoxiong
 Lashan
 Jiulong
4 towns

3 townships
 Dashuijing
 Zhongshan
 Laochang
3 ethnic townships
 Lubuge Buyi and Miao
 Jiuwuji Yi
 Zhangdi Buyi

Ethnic groups
The Luoping County Gazetteer (1995:601) lists the following Yi subgroups and their respective locations.

Wopu  / Large Black Yi 
Majie town : Dayiben , Jiudaogou , Jigu 
Agang township : Satuge 
Nasupu  / Small Black Yi  (pop. 20,000+)
Huancheng township : Poyi 
Fule town : Lefeng 
Alu township : Qile , Feige 
Agang township : Yiyi 
Jiuwuji township : Anmule , Muxing , Fawan , Laozhai 
Majie town : Daimo , Luji 
Changdi township : Deshao , Bazuo 
Gepu  / Gan Yi  (pop. 4,300+)
Huancheng township : Zhonghe , Budai 
Awu  (pop. 100)
Huancheng township 
Luwu  / White Yi 

Buyi is also spoken in Luoping County. Zhou (2013) documents the Buyi dialects of Shangmute 上木特, Xiamute 下木特, Dabulong 大补笼, and Yize 以则 villages, all of which are in Changdi Township 长底乡.

Climate

References

External links
Luoping County Official WebSite

County-level divisions of Qujing